Hadamczik is a surname. Notable people with the surname include:

Alois Hadamczik (born 1952), Czech ice hockey coach
Evžen Hadamczik (1939–1984), Czech footballer and manager